Erik Westlin (23 February 1913 – 8 April 1977) was a Swedish discus thrower. He won the national title in 1942 and 1946 and placed sixth at the 1946 European Championships.

References

Swedish male discus throwers
1913 births
1977 deaths